Mago Point is a location in Waterford, Connecticut. It was originally owned by the building company Titus and Bishop, who planned to make it into many 25 x 100-foot lots. Before these owners acted on their plans, Earl and Doris Wadsworth bought them out. Now it is home to several marine businesses.

Attractions
Mago Point is home to the following businesses:

Mago Point Canvas & Upholstery
Mago Point Canvas & Upholstery fabricates all types of Custom Marine Canvas and Upholstery and offers repairs and replacements of existing products.

The Dock Restaurant
The Dock Restaurant serves seafood and fried pickles.

The Sunbeam Fleet
The Sunbeam Fleet is a sport fishing dock with a fleet of fishing boats. They have been open for over 75 years.

Mago Point Marina
Mago Point Marina is a boat marina.

Sunset Ribs
Sunset Ribs is a restaurant and bar with live music.

Hillyers Bait and Tackle
Hillyers Bait and Tackle is a fishing supply shop.

Mijoy 747
The Mijoy 747 is an 85-foot aluminum boat for private charter and fishing.

Mago Point Packy
Mago Point Packy is a package store.

Linda Harrington's Niantic Bay Boat Valet
This is a boating store and a dealer of Pro-Line boats, Baja and Mercury outboard dealer with storage facilities.

References 

Waterford, Connecticut
Geography of New London County, Connecticut